Cottontree and Winewall are two hamlets situated in the civil parish of Trawden Forest in Pendle, Lancashire. They are adjacent to one other and located between the towns of Colne and Trawden. Cottontree is generally situated in the valley along the road that connects the two towns. Winewall is generally on the hillside overlooking Cottontree. The road that runs between Cottontree and Winewall connects to Laneshaw Bridge, Wycoller and is an alternative route to Trawden.

Until 2001 Winewall had one of England's last Inghamite chapels.

See also

Listed buildings in Trawden Forest

References

External links

 Mike Baker Website - Info & Photos of Cottontree & Winewall
 Pendle Net - Winewall Webpages
 Pendle Life - Cottontree/Winewall/Trawden
 Trawden Online Website - History of Trawden, Winewall and Cottontree
 The Waddington Family of the area

Towns and villages in the Borough of Pendle